Sardar Biglari (born August 30, 1977) is an American entrepreneur and is the founder, chairman and CEO of Biglari Holdings, a holding company that trades on the New York Stock Exchange under the symbol BH. Biglari controls the Steak 'n Shake Company, First Guard Insurance, Maxim, Southern Oil of Louisiana, Southern Pioneer Insurance and the Western Sizzlin' corporation, which are subsidiaries of Biglari Holdings. Biglari is also founder, chairman and CEO of Biglari Capital, the general partner to The Lion Fund.

Early history
Biglari was born in Iran in 1977, two years before the Iranian Revolution. His father, Brigadier General Biglari, served in the Imperial Iranian Armed Forces. Following the revolution, the family escaped Iran as refugees, and in 1984, settled in San Antonio, Texas.

Business career
At the age of 18, he founded INTX.net, an Internet service provider, by raising $15,000. In 1999 with concerns about the tech bubble, he sold the company to Internet America.
With the proceeds of the sale, Biglari started an investment partnership at the age of 22. The fund bought shares in restaurant companies including Friendly Ice Cream and Western Sizzlin Corp., which he became chairman and CEO of in 2006. Friendly Ice Cream founder, S. Prestley Blake, found an ally in Biglari  and he cashed out and profited when Friendly's was bought out by a private-equity firm. The case was covered by Harvard Business School Professors Fabrizio Ferri, V.G. Narayanan and James Weber.

Biglari operates Biglari Holdings in San Antonio with a corporate staff of 4. The holding company has over 21,000 employees in total.

Steak 'n Shake
In August 2008, Biglari took over Steak 'n Shake, which had been losing more than $100,000 a day.  Biglari turned the company around from near insolvency to one making more than $100,000 a day.  By 2015, the company had attained 24 consecutive quarters of same-store sales increases under Biglari.  However, since that time Steak 'n Shake has run into serious headwinds. In 2018, the number of customers hit their lowest levels in 8 years dropping to 103 million while same store sales fell 5.1%. Biglari has largely attributed the challenges to slow service speed due to a lack of investment in kitchen equipment.

In 2019, Steak ‘n Shake began franchising company owned restaurants to select candidates for $10,000 and 50% of the profits.  So far, 51 Steak n Shake franchise partners have come on board. Biglari hopes to hit 100 by year-end. There are franchise owners in the program who are on their way to earning over $200,000 in their first year.

Cracker Barrel
Biglari bought 4.7 million shares of Cracker Barrel in 2011. 
In 2014, Harvard Business School professors Suraj Srinivasan and Tim Gray wrote a case study on Biglari and Cracker Barrel. 
On March 14, 2019, it was reported that Biglari wants Cracker Barrel to close its Start up company Holler & Dash.
The original $241 million investment in Cracker Barrel made in 2011 and 2012 turned into just under $1 billion in value by the end of 2019.

Maxim
On February 27, 2014, Maxim Magazine was bought by Biglari who commented, "We plan to build the business on multiple dimensions, thereby energizing our readership and viewership.".  In January 2016, Biglari officially took over as editor-in-chief of Maxim, though a Maxim staffer said that the new masthead title just formalizes what has always been clear: Biglari exercises full editorial control over Maxim.  At one point in 2015, the staffer said, he decided to throw out a nearly complete version of the December issue in order to completely redesign the magazine.  On January 13, 2016 Gilles Bensimon joined Biglari as a special creative director.  "What drew me to Maxim was Sardar's vision for the brand," said Bensimon.

First Guard Insurance
On March 19, 2014, Biglari purchased First Guard Insurance Company.  First Guard Founder and CEO Ed Campbell said: "I couldn't imagine a better, more fitting owner of First Guard."

Southern Pioneer Property and Casualty Insurance
In 2020, Biglari acquired Southern Pioneer Property & Casualty Insurance Co. from the Hyneman family who will continue to operate the company.  Since 1981, Southern Pioneer has grown from $500,000 in capital and surplus and zero premium to over $18,000,000 capital and surplus with written premium in excess of $24,000,000 in 2015.

Southern Oil of Louisiana
In September 2019, Biglari acquired Southern Oil of Louisiana Inc. for $51.5 million.

References

1977 births
Living people
American investors
American money managers
20th-century American businesspeople
Businesspeople from Tehran
Iranian emigrants to the United States
Trinity University (Texas) alumni
21st-century American businesspeople
Businesspeople from San Antonio